Fraser Patrick (born 8 November 1985) is a Scottish professional snooker player from Glasgow.

Career
Patrick started his professional career in 2002 by playing Challenge Tour, where he spent three seasons without success. In 2007 Patrick earned the Scottish nomination to make his Main Tour debut. Aside from Grand Prix, where he won four matches at the round-robin qualifying stage and finished third in his group, he was to struggle for wins during his debut season and was relegated from the tour.

With the introduction of Q School, Patrick came agonisingly close to regaining his tour place, twice losing his final match both in 2011 and 2012. Nevertheless, thanks to his high Q School ranking Patrick was able to compete in all the major ranking tournaments of the 2012/13 season as an amateur. He enjoyed his best ever performance at the 2013 German Masters, where he beat Michael White and Martin Gould to qualify to the venue stages and was leading Ali Carter 3–1 before eventually losing 5–3. He also recorded an impressive 10–6 win against Luca Brecel at the World Championship qualifiers. Patrick was to end the season on a high note, as in the final round of Q School Event 3 he edged out Ashley Carty 4–3 to regain his place on the main tour.

Patrick won just three matches during the 2013–14 season, all of them in the minor-ranking European Tour events, to end up ranked world number 119.

His 2014–15 season was much better as he started it by beating Jimmy White 5–2 to qualify for the 2014 Wuxi Classic. In Patrick's debut at a Chinese ranking event he lost 5–3 to Sam Baird. He whitewashed Stuart Bingham 4–0 at the minor-ranking Paul Hunter Classic and then defeated Matthew Stevens 4–3 and Jamie Jones 4–1 to reach the last 16, where Rod Lawler ended his run 4–0. Patrick won his first ever match at the venue stage of a ranking event by seeing off Jamie Burnett 6–4 at the UK Championship. He then knocked out world number 22 Ryan Day 6–4, during which he made a 139 break which went on to be the third highest of the event. In his second last 32 appearance at a ranking event he lost 6–3 to Judd Trump. Patrick qualified for the Indian Open, but lost 4–2 to Jamie Cope in the first round. Patrick could not get into the top 64 in the world rankings (he was 77th), but by finishing 40th on the European Order of Merit he earned himself a new two-year tour place.

Patrick began the 2015–16 season by whitewashing Michael Williams 5–0 and beating Tom Ford 5–1 to reach the third qualifying round of the Australian Goldfields Open, but lost 5–3 to David Morris. He was knocked out in the first round of the UK Championship 6–4 by Michael Holt. Patrick lost in a deciding frame to world number three Neil Robertson in the first round of the Welsh Open.

At the 2016 English Open, Patrick eliminated Zak Surety 4–1 and James Wattana 4–2 and then narrowly lost 4–3 to John Higgins in the third round. He reached the same stage of the Northern Ireland Open after only conceding one frame during wins over Marc Davis and Duane Jones, but he was thrashed 4–0 by Barry Hawkins. Patrick lost the final two frames both times in his 6–5 and 5–4 first round defeats to Michael White and Mark Joyce at the UK Championship and China Open respectively. He entered Q School to try and stay on the tour as he has finished the season outside of the top 64 in the rankings at world number 105, but failed to advance beyond the third round of either event.

In May 2019, Patrick came through Q-School - Event 2 by winning six matches to earn a two-year card on the World Snooker Tour for the 2019–20 and 2020–21 seasons.

Performance and rankings timeline

Career finals

Amateur finals: 3 (2 titles)

References

External links

 
Fraser Patrick at worldsnooker.com

1985 births
Living people
Scottish snooker players
Sportspeople from Glasgow